Kunek may refer to:
 Kunek, Hormozgan, a village in Iran
Alice Kunek (born 1991), Australian basketball player
 Other Lives (band)